is a Japanese street skateboarder.

He placed seventeenth in the men's street event at the 2020 Summer Olympics, the first event of its kind ever included in an Olympic program.

References

External links 

 
 Yukito Aoki at The Boardr

Living people
2003 births
Japanese skateboarders
Olympic skateboarders of Japan
People from Shizuoka (city)
Skateboarders at the 2020 Summer Olympics
21st-century Japanese people